Telluride Association Summer Programs, or TASPs, are selective six-week educational experiences for rising high school seniors offering intellectual challenges beyond secondary school level.

Description

The programs are designed to bring together young and intellectually bright students from around the world who share a passion for learning.  The participants, or TASPers, attend an intensive seminar led by college and university faculty members and participate in many educational and social activities outside the classroom.  Like the Telluride houses, each TASP receives a discretionary budget, whose use is democratically distributed via weekly house meetings.

Many students are invited to apply based on strong standardized test scores, such as by scoring highly on the PSAT, or through the nomination of educators who are familiar with TASP. However, any high school junior may request an application, and acceptance largely ignores standardized test scores and graded academic performance. Like other Telluride programs, TASPs are free.

TASPs also advocate a self-contained community of learning among the TASPers at any one of the four TASP seminars. TASPers are encouraged to engage in activities together outside of seminars. Often, TASPers form close bonds over six weeks as a result of the self-contained community that forms.

Since the first TASP was held in 1954, TASPs have been held at college and university campuses across the United States, including Cornell, University of Texas at Austin, Deep Springs College, Johns Hopkins University, Williams College, University of Michigan, Washington University in St. Louis, Kenyon College, and St. John's College.

Nationally known faculty who have taught at TASP include Blakey Vermeule (Stanford), John Schaar (UC Santa Cruz), Hanna Pitkin (UC Berkeley), Donald Kagan (Yale), Herbert Storing (University of Chicago), Robert Nozick (Harvard), Leon Kass (University of Chicago), and Thomas Palaima (University of Texas).

Alumni of TASPs and Telluride Houses include political economist Francis Fukuyama; literary critic Gayatri Spivak; political theorist William Galston; former Stanford Law dean Kathleen Sullivan; Nobel laureates in physics Steven Weinberg and Richard Feynman; journalist and biographer Walter Isaacson; author Daniel Alarcón; Harvard Law School professor Noah Feldman; Harvard English professor and Dean of Undergraduate Education Amanda Claybaugh; 2008 MacArthur Fellow Rachel Wilson; former World Bank president Paul Wolfowitz; filmmaker Glen Pitre; former Writers Guild of America West president Howard A. Rodman; philosophers Thomas Nagel and Barbara Herman; Olympic medalist Bonnie St. John; queer theorist Eve Kosofsky Sedgwick; Manhattan Institute president Reihan Salam; author and Democratic politician Stacey Abrams; Stanford Professor and founder of N+1 Mark Greif; and, lawyer Loulan Pitre, Jr.

Admission
Admission to TASP is based on an application that includes six essay prompts and, for some, an interview.  The number of applications received each year has increased, leading to a decline in the acceptance rate. In 2012, out of 1350 applicants, 140 were given an interview, and 64 were finally selected to the program, leading to a 4.7% acceptance rate. In comparison, in 2009, out of approximately 1000 applicants, 135 were given an interview with members or associates of the Telluride Association as well as TASP alumni, and a total of 68 students were eventually admitted to the four TASPs, or approximately 6.8%.  In 2010, out of more than 1000 applicants, 107 were given an interview and only 50 were admitted to the program, bringing the acceptance rate down to 5%. In 2011, there were approximately 1100 applicants to four TASPs; 133 were selected for interview and 64 were ultimately admitted to the program. This brought the acceptance rate to 5.8%.

Program revamp
Starting with the summer of 2022, the Telluride Association retired the names of its two previous summer programs, including TASP and the Telluride Association Sophomore Seminar (TASS). Instead, the Association began offering summer programs under two new names: the Telluride Association Summer Seminar in Critical Black Studies (TASS-CBS) and the Telluride Association Summer Seminar in Anti-Oppressive Studies (TASS-AOS).

Criticism
Vincent Lloyd, professor and director of the Center for Political Theology at Villanova University, wrote an article about his experience teaching at the Telluride Association Summer Program in his article, "A Black Professor Trapped in an Anti-Racist Hell."  He describes a cult-like experience focused on parroting anti-racist slogans.  He states that two Asian students, as well as himself, were kicked out of the program for alleged racism.

References

External links
 Official TASP Website

Summer camps in the United States
Telluride Association